Central Entrerriano is a team in Gualeguaychú, Argentina playing in the Liga Nacional de Básquetbol (LNB). Their home arena is Jose Maria Bertora Arena.

Team Roster 2009-2010

References

Basketball teams in Argentina
Gualeguaychú, Entre Ríos
Sport in Entre Ríos Province